Cherokee descent, "being of Cherokee descent", or "being a Cherokee descendant" are all terms for individuals who have some degree of documented Cherokee ancestry but do not meet the criteria for tribal citizenship. The terms are also used by individuals who self-identify as Cherokee but without either documentation or community recognition.

As Gregory D. Smithers has discussed, a large number of Americans believe they belong in this category: "In 2000, the federal census reported that 729,533 Americans self-identified as Cherokee. By 2010, that number increased, with the Census Bureau reporting that 819,105 Americans claimed at least one Cherokee ancestor." By contrast, as of 2012 there were only 330,716 enrolled Cherokee citizens (Cherokee Nation: 288,749; United Keetoowah Band: 14,300; Eastern Band: 14,667).

Citizenship
There are three federally recognized Cherokee tribes: the Eastern Band of Cherokee Indians (ECBI) in North Carolina, the United Keetoowah Band of Cherokee Indians (UKB) in Oklahoma, and the Cherokee Nation (CN) in Oklahoma. Enrollment criteria are different for each nation.
 Eastern Band citizenship requirements are as follows:
"1. A direct lineal ancestor must appear on the 1924 Baker Roll of the Eastern Band of Cherokee Indians.
"2. You must possess at least 1/16 degree of Eastern Cherokee blood. Please note: Blood quantum is calculated from your ancestor listed on the 1924 Baker Roll."
 United Keetoowah Band requirements are as follows:
"The UKB has a minimum blood quantum requirement of one quarter (1/4) degree Keetoowah Cherokee blood."
 Cherokee Nation requirements are as follows:
The applicant must "provide documents that connect you to an enrolled lineal ancestor, who is listed on the 'DAWES ROLL' FINAL ROLLS OF CITIZENS AND FREEDMEN OF THE FIVE CIVILIZED TRIBES, Cherokee Nation with a blood degree."

Social recognition
Kim TallBear (Dakota), author of Native American DNA: Tribal Belonging and the False Promise of Genetic Science, has written extensively that Indigenous identity is not about one distant (and possibly nonexistent) ancestor, but rather political citizenship, culture, kinship, and daily, lived experience as part of an Indigenous community.

Reasons for self-identification without citizenship or social recognition
"Self-identification" is when a person claims Indigenous identity or descent with no confirmation or acceptance from the tribe they claim. There are a number of reasons people have given for self-identifying as Cherokee or as descendants, despite not meeting enrollment criteria, and without being part of the Cherokee community:
 Many Cherokee heritage groups, organizations that explore Cherokee history and culture, exist across the US, as well as unrecognized organizations claiming to be tribes, with one estimate putting the combined number as high as 200. Membership in these groups, in some cases, requires genealogical proof of Cherokee ancestry, but many others have no requirements at all.
 Many non-Indigenous American families, especially white and Black families with roots in the South, have a family oral history of Cherokee ancestry. This has sometimes been called "Cherokee Princess Syndrome", or having a family "Blood Myth."
 Laura Browder notes that some light-skinned African American families in the late 19th and early 20th centuries wrote "themselves into Native American identity and out of whiteness or blackness."
 Anthropologist Kim TallBear describes some individuals discovering what they believe to be Native American ancestry through DNA testing, who begin searching for "Cherokee ancestral lines" after this. She notes, however, "There is no DNA test to prove you're Native American." and that this group mostly continues to identify as white.

Issues with descent-based identity claims
Individuals who claim Cherokee descent do not meet the criteria necessary to claim Native American identity under the provisions of the American Indian Arts and Crafts Act

The academic Joel W. Martin noted that "an astonishing number of southerners assert they have a grandmother or great-grandmother who was some kind of Cherokee, often a princess", and that such myths serve settler purposes in aligning American frontier romance with southern regionalism and pride.

See also
Índia pega no laço
Native American ancestry
Pretendian

Notes 

American genealogy
American people who self-identify as being of Native American descent
Cherokee heritage groups
Cherokee in popular culture
Demographic history of the United States
Fakelore
Multiracial affairs in the United States
Native American families
Native American history
Native American-related controversies